Alburnett High School is a rural public high school located in Alburnett, Linn County, Iowa, United States, and is the only high school operated by the Alburnett Community School District. Total enrollment for the district is about 710 students, as of 2018.

Athletics
The Pirates participate in the Tri-Rivers Conference in the following sports:
Football
Cross Country
Volleyball
Basketball
Wrestling
 3-time Class 1A State Champions (2013, 2015, 2016 
 2-time Class 1A State Duals Champions (2013, 2016)
Golf
Track and Field
 Girls' 2019 Class 1A State Champions
Baseball
Softball
 2-time Class 1A State Champions (1999, 2005)

See also
List of school districts in Iowa

References

Public high schools in Iowa
Public middle schools in Iowa
Schools in Linn County, Iowa